Virrudh (Against) is a Hindi language Indian soap opera that premiered on Sony Entertainment Television on 26 March 2007 and ended on 17 January 2008. The series is jointly produced by Smriti Irani's production house Ugraya Entertainment and Aditya Birla Group's media arm Applause Entertainment, and starrs Smriti Irani, Achint Kaur and Mihika Verma.

Plot
Virrudh's story revolves around Vasudha who is torn between her father Dhirendra Raisinghania and her love Sushant. Dhirendra is a power hungry media baron who has political connections and is passionate about his newspaper business entitled "Dainik Darpan". Vasudha blindly trusts her father's innocent make believe identity and is unaware of his dark past. Astound by his daughters' loyalty, Dhirendra decides to get her to lead his business in the future but is in constant fear that his secret bearers will reveal his evildoings to her, hence devastating his future plans. His secret bearers include some of his own family members, Sushant (Vasudha's fiancée and the chief crime reporter of Dainik Darpan) and his mother, and his political associate Sinha.

Cast
 Vikram Gokhale as Dhirendra Raisinghania
 Sushant Singh as Sushant Sharma (Vasudha's Husband)
 Smriti Irani as Vasudha Raisinghania / Vasudha Sushant Sharma
 Achint Kaur as Vedika Raisinghania
 Karan Veer Mehra as Vedant Raisinghania
 Mihika Verma as Shreya Raisinghania / Shreya Siddharth Chopra
 Ashwini Kalsekar as Devyani
 Govind Namdev as Mr. Sinha
 Zarina Wahab as Shalini (Vasudha's Mother)
 Mohan Bhandari as Virendra Raisinghania (Dhirendra's Younger Brother)
 Anand Suryavanshi as Dhairya Raisinghania (Virendra's Younger Son)
 Chetan Hansraj as Rudraksh Raisinghania (Virendra's Elder Son)
 Apara Mehta as Uttara Sharma (Sushant's Mother)
 Anup Soni as Vikram
 Niyati Joshi as  Aarti
 Pariva Pranati as Sandhya Vedant Raisinghania
 Aashka Goradia as Naina Siddharth Chopra
 Usha Nadkarni as Nani
 Bharti Achrekar as Bua
 Aanjjan Srivastav as Pandey Ji
 Sanjeet Bedi as Siddharth Chopra

Awards

The Indian Television Academy (ITA) Awards, 2007

 Best Actress in a Supporting Role - Achint Kaur
 Best Director (Drama) - Santram Verma
 Best Dialogues - Kamlesh Pandey

Indian Telly Awards, 2007

 Best Actress (Critics' Choice) - Smriti Irani
 Best Ensemble Cast - Virrudh
 Best Dialogues - Kamlesh Pandey

References

External links
Official Site

Indian television soap operas
Sony Entertainment Television original programming
2007 Indian television series debuts
2008 Indian television series endings